Here are the finalists and winners at the 1990 Billboard Music Awards.

Winners

References

External links 

Billboard Music Award
Billboard awards
Billboard Music Awards
Billboard Music Awards
Billboard Music Awards